Mohamed Farhat Chida (born September 11, 1982) is a Paralympic athlete from Tunisia competing mainly in category T38 sprint events.

Biographies
Between 1990 and 1997, Mohamed competed in able bodied athletics and cycling, he was injured in a road accident in 2003 and diagnosed with cerebral palsy. He marked his debut in 2004 Summer Paralympics in Athens.

Achievements
He competed in the 2004 Summer Paralympics in Athens, Greece.  There he won a gold medal in the men's 4 x 400 metre relay – T35-38 event, a silver medal in the men's 200 metres – T38 event, a bronze medal in the men's 100 metres – T38 event and finished sixth in the men's 400 metres – T38 event.

He also competed at the 2008 Summer Paralympics in Beijing, China.    There he won a gold medal in the men's Long jump – F37-38 event, a gold medal in the men's 400 metres – T38 event, a silver medal in the men's 4 x 100 metre relay – T35-38 event, finished fifth in the men's 100 metres – T38 event and finished fourth in the men's 200 metres – T38 event.

At the 2012 Summer Paralympics in London, UK, Mohamed Farhat won a gold medal in the men's 400 metres – T38 event.

Athletics
 Men's 400 m T38
 Men's Long Jump – F37/38
 Men's 100 m T38
 Men's 200 m T38

Hobbies
Travel, music, sport. (Athlete, 14 Dec 2010)

Language(s) spoken

Arabic, French, English

Club name

National Federation of Sports for the Disabled, Tunis, TUN

Coach

Abdallah Machraoui (TUN) from 2010 (Athlete, 14 Dec 2010)

See also
 Tunisia at the 2012 Summer Paralympics
 Tunisia at the Paralympics

References

External links 
 

Paralympic athletes of Tunisia
Athletes (track and field) at the 2004 Summer Paralympics
Athletes (track and field) at the 2008 Summer Paralympics
Paralympic gold medalists for Tunisia
Paralympic silver medalists for Tunisia
Paralympic bronze medalists for Tunisia
Living people
1982 births
World record holders in Paralympic athletics
Athletes (track and field) at the 2012 Summer Paralympics
Medalists at the 2004 Summer Paralympics
Medalists at the 2008 Summer Paralympics
Medalists at the 2012 Summer Paralympics
Tunisian male sprinters
Paralympic medalists in athletics (track and field)
Athletes (track and field) at the 2020 Summer Paralympics